Lake County is a county located in the northwest part of the U.S. state of Montana.  As of the 2020 census, the population was 31,134. Its county seat is Polson.

Geography
Over two-thirds (67.7%) of the county's land lies within the Flathead Indian Reservation.

Adjacent counties
 Flathead County - north
 Missoula County - east
 Sanders County - west

National protected areas

 Bison Range (part)
 Flathead National Forest (part)
 Ninepipe National Wildlife Refuge
 Pablo National Wildlife Refuge
 Swan River National Wildlife Refuge

Politics

Demographics

2000 census
As of the 2000 United States census, of 2000, there were 26,507 people, 10,192 households, and 7,215 families living in the county. The population density was 18 people per square mile (7/km2). There were 13,605 housing units at an average density of 9 per square mile (4/km2). The racial makeup of the county was 71.38% White, 0.12% Black or African American, 23.79% Native American, 0.30% Asian, 0.04% Pacific Islander, 0.67% from other races, and 3.70% from two or more races. 2.52% of the population were Hispanic or Latino of any race. 19.7% were of German, 8.8% Irish, 7.8% English, 5.4% Norwegian and 5.4% American ancestry. 94.3% spoke English, 1.6% Salish and 1.2% Spanish as their first language.

There were 10,192 households, out of which 33.00% had children under the age of 18 living with them, 54.80% were married couples living together, 11.50% had a female householder with no husband present, and 29.20% were non-families. 24.50% of all households were made up of individuals, and 9.90% had someone living alone who was 65 years of age or older.  The average household size was 2.54 and the average family size was 3.02.

The county population contained 28.10% under the age of 18, 8.00% from 18 to 24, 24.50% from 25 to 44, 24.90% from 45 to 64, and 14.50% who were 65 years of age or older. The median age was 38 years. For every 100 females there were 96.70 males. For every 100 females age 18 and over, there were 93.10 males.

The median income for a household in the county was $28,740, and the median income for a family was $34,033. Males had a median income of $27,009 versus $19,162 for females. The per capita income for the county was $15,173. About 14.00% of families and 18.70% of the population were below the poverty line, including 24.20% of those under age 18 and 8.30% of those age 65 or over.

2010 census
As of the 2010 United States census, there were 28,746 people, 11,432 households, and 7,770 families living in the county. The racial makeup of the county was 69.4% white, 22.0% American Indian, 0.4% Asian, 0.3% black or African American, 0.1% Pacific islander, 0.5% from other races, and 7.3% from two or more races. Those of Hispanic or Latino origin made up 3.5% of the population. In terms of ancestry, 22.3% were German, 11.6% were English, 11.5% were Irish, 6.9% were Norwegian, and 3.8% were American.

Of the 11,432 households, 31.0% had children under the age of 18 living with them, 51.0% were married couples living together, 11.5% had a female householder with no husband present, 32.0% were non-families, and 26.5% of all households were made up of individuals. The average household size was 2.46 and the average family size was 2.97. The median age was 41.3 years.

The median income for a household in the county was $37,274 and the median income for a family was $47,437. Males had a median income of $37,461 versus $26,637 for females. The per capita income for the county was $20,164. About 15.4% of families and 21.6% of the population were below the poverty line, including 33.9% of those under age 18 and 9.3% of those age 65 or over.

Communities

Cities
 Polson (county seat)
 Ronan

Town
 St. Ignatius

Census-designated places

 Arlee
 Bear Dance
 Big Arm
 Charlo
 Dayton
 Elmo
 Finley Point
 Jette
 Kerr
 Kicking Horse
 Kings Point
 Lake Mary Ronan
 Lindisfarne
 Niarada
 Pablo
 Ravalli
 Rocky Point
 Rollins
 Swan Lake
 Turtle Lake
 Woods Bay

Unincorporated communities

 Allentown
 Post Creek
 Proctor
 Round Butte
 Salmon Prairie
 Sipes

See also
 List of lakes in Lake County, Montana
 List of mountains in Lake County, Montana
 National Register of Historic Places listings in Lake County, Montana

References

 
1923 establishments in Montana
Populated places established in 1923